Valibar Sangham is a 1938 Indian Tamil-language film written and directed by A. N. Kalyanasundaram and produced by Sagar Movietone. The film stars Mathrimangalam Natesha Iyer, Subhadra, Lakshmanan, and Rukmini in lead roles. This is also Kumari Kamala's first film.

Cast 
List in order of from the film's songbook:
 Mathrimangalam Natesa Iyer as Natesan
 Subhadra as Kamala
 Lakshmanan as Sundaram
 Rukmini as Rukmini
 Gopalakrishnan as Gopal
 Ramanujachari as Ramanujam
 Janaki as Seetha
 Kokilam (Chellappa) as Kokilam
 Pruhathambal as Jaya
 Lakshmi as Sakunthala
 Kamala as Leela
 T. K. T. Chari as Chari
 Shripadha Shankar as Shankar
 Vaidyanathan as Vaidhi
 Sadhasivan as Sadhasivan
 Amirthesan as Amirthesan

Soundtrack 
The music was composed by A. N. Kalyanasundaram and P. S. Anantharaman. The lyrics were penned by A. N. Kalyanasundaram and the songs were recorded by S. C. Patil.

References